Rear admiral (RAdm) is a flag officer rank of the Royal Navy. It is immediately superior to commodore and is subordinate to vice admiral. It is a two-star rank and has a NATO ranking code of OF-7.

The equivalent rank in the British Army and Royal Marines is major-general; and in the Royal Air Force, it is air vice-marshal.

History
The rank originated in the 17th century, in the days of naval sailing squadrons when each naval squadron would be assigned an admiral as its head.  The admiral would command from the centre vessel and direct the activities of the squadron.

The admiral would in turn be assisted by a vice admiral, who commanded the lead ships which would bear the brunt of a naval battle. In the rear of the naval squadron, a third admiral would command the remaining ships and, as this section of the squadron was considered to be in the least danger, the admiral in command of the rear would typically be the most junior of the squadron admirals. This has survived into the modern age, with the rank of rear admiral the most junior of the admiralty ranks of many navies.

Prior to 1864 the Royal Navy was divided into coloured squadrons which determined career path. The command flags flown by a rear-admiral changed a number of times during this period.

The Royal Navy rank of rear admiral should be distinguished from the office of Rear-Admiral of the United Kingdom, which is an Admiralty position usually held by a senior (and possibly retired) "full" admiral.

Rank insignia and personal flag

Former command flags

See also

 British and U.S. military ranks compared
 Coloured squadrons of the Royal Navy
 Comparative military ranks
 Rear-Admiral of the Blue
 Rear-Admiral of the White
 Rear-Admiral of the Red
 Royal Navy officer rank insignia
 List of Royal Navy rear admirals

References

Sources
Perrin, W. G. (William Gordon) (1922). "IV:Flags of Command". British flags, their early history, and their development at sea; with an account of the origin of the flag as a national device. Cambridge, England: Cambridge : The University Press.

Military ranks of the Royal Navy

it:Retroammiraglio#Regno Unito